Pollina (Sicilian: Puòddina) is a comune (municipality) in the Metropolitan City of Palermo in the Italian region Sicily, located about  east of Palermo. Pollina probably occupies the site of the ancient city of Apollonia.

The municipality of Pollina contains the frazione (subdivision) Finale .

Pollina borders the following municipalities: Castelbuono, Cefalù, San Mauro Castelverde.

Demographic evolution

References

Municipalities of the Metropolitan City of Palermo